Rich McCready (born February 9, 1970 in Seneca, Missouri) is an American country music singer-songwriter. McCready signed to Magnatone Records in 1995 and recorded two albums for the label. His highest charting single, "Thinkin' Strait," peaked at number 53 in 1996. Rich also has 4 kids Kirby, Jordan, Savannah, Jaab

Discography

Albums

Singles

Music videos

References

External links

1970 births
American country guitarists
American male guitarists
American country singer-songwriters
American male singer-songwriters
Living people
Singer-songwriters from Missouri
People from Seneca, Missouri
Guitarists from Missouri
21st-century American singers
Country musicians from Missouri
21st-century American guitarists
21st-century American male singers